During the 2010–11 English football season, Charlton Athletic F.C. competed in Football League One.

Season summary
Charlton managed to start off their first season after relegation from the Championship with some good results and looked safe bets for an automatic return to the second tier of English football, but a late slump saw Charlton fall to fourth, still good enough for a playoff spot. After a 2–1 defeat at the County Ground and a 2–1 win at the Valley saw Charlton draw 3–3 on aggregate with Swindon Town, the two teams went to a penalty shootout. Nicky Bailey missed his penalty to give Swindon the win, thus condemning Charlton to another season in the third tier.

Charlton also suffered demoralising defeats in the first rounds in both domestic cups. In the FA Cup, Charlton lost 1–0 to Northwich Victoria at Victoria Stadium, while, in the League Cup, Charlton lost 1–0 after extra time to Hereford United at Edgar Street.

Kit
Spanish company Joma remained Charlton's kit manufacturers, and introduced a new home and a new away kit for the season, the home kit featuring a white vertical stripe last seen on the club's centenary kit in 2005, the away kit featuring black shorts and socks and a blue and black striped shirt. The kits were sponsored by krbs.com, but, for the match against Millwall on 19 December, the club wore kits sponsoring the Street Violence Ruins Lives campaign, with proceeds going to the Rob Knox Memorial Fund. Rob Knox was an actor and a Charlton fan who was stabbed to death in a street attack in May 2008.

Players

First-team squad
Squad at end of season

Left club during season

Statistics

Starting 11
Considering starts in all competitions
 GK: #1,  Rob Elliot, 35
 RB: #2,  Frazer Richardson, 39
 CB: #35,  Christian Dailly, 49
 CB: #5,  Miguel Llera, 25
 LB: #3,  Kelly Youga, 22
 RM: #11,  Lloyd Sam, 44
 CM: #6,  Jose Semedo, 40
 CM: #8,  Therry Racon, 39
 LM: #4,  Nicky Bailey, 47
 CF: #10,  Deon Burton, 37
 CF: #23,  Dave Mooney, 23

References

Notes

Charlton Athletic F.C. seasons
Charlton Athletic F.C.